Li Qiumei (born September 26, 1974) is a retired female Chinese discus thrower.

Her personal best throw was 67.50 metres, achieved in May 1994 in Beijing. The Chinese and Asian record is currently held by Xiao Yanling with 71.68 metres.

Achievements

References

1974 births
Living people
Athletes (track and field) at the 2000 Summer Olympics
Chinese female discus throwers
Olympic athletes of China
Universiade medalists in athletics (track and field)
Universiade gold medalists for China
Medalists at the 2001 Summer Universiade